Wuzui Township is a rural township in Nan County, Hunan Province, People's Republic of China.

Administrative division
The township is divided into 20 villages and 1 community, the following areas: Zhaoming Community, Xinzhou Village, Xinli Village, Xinmin Village, Dongcheng Village, Chaoxi Village, Dayuan Village, Gangkou Village, Chaoqian Village, Qunfeng Village, Jiaozui Village, Dongge Village, Baimo Village, Niuchang Village, Luowen Village, Donghe Village, Sainan Village, Dongnan Village, Wenjia Village, Changchun Village, and Anle Village (昭明社区、新洲村、新立村、新民村、东成村、朝锡村、大垸村、港口村、朝前村、群峰村、窑嘴村、东阁村、白沫村、牛场村、罗文村、东河村、赛南村、东南村、文家村、长春村、安乐村).

References

Divisions of Nan County